is a trans-Neptunian object, both considered a scattered and detached object, located in the outermost region of the Solar System. It was first observed on 29 September 2013, by astronomers at the Mauna Kea Observatories in Hawaii, United States.

Orbit and classification 

 orbits the Sun at a distance of 45.5–78.1 AU once every 485 years and 9 months (177,421 days; semi-major axis of 61.79 AU). Its orbit has an eccentricity of 0.26 and an inclination of 26° with respect to the ecliptic.

Considered both a scattered and detached object,  is particularly unusual as it has an unusually circular orbit for a scattered-disc object (SDO). Although it is thought that traditional scattered-disc objects have been ejected into their current orbits by gravitational interactions with Neptune, the low eccentricity of its orbit and the distance of its perihelion (SDOs generally have highly eccentric orbits and perihelia less than 38 AU) seems hard to reconcile with such celestial mechanics. This has led to some uncertainty as to the current theoretical understanding of the outer Solar System. The theories include close stellar passages, unseen planet/rogue planets/planetary embryos in the early Kuiper belt, and resonance interaction with an outward-migrating Neptune. The Kozai mechanism is capable of transferring orbital eccentricity to a higher inclination. It is in a 3:1 resonance to Neptune.

Physical characteristics 

Johnston's archive estimates a diameter of 134 kilometers based on an assumed albedo of 0.09, while American astronomer Michael Brown, calculates a diameter of 135 kilometers, using an estimated albedo of 0.08 and an absolute magnitude of 7.8.

References

External links 
 List Of Centaurs and Scattered-Disk Objects, Minor Planet Center
 List of Known Trans-Neptunian Objects, Johnston's Archive
 
 

Minor planet object articles (unnumbered)

20130929